Denny Walley is an American guitarist who was born in Pennsylvania 4 February 1943. He is known for working with Frank Zappa in the 1970s and '80s.

Career

Denny Walley spent much of his childhood in New York City before his family moved to Lancaster, California, in 1955 where he met Frank Zappa.

Denny Walley has played with many bands over the years and is best known for his work with Frank Zappa's Mothers of Invention and Captain Beefheart's Magic Band. He also played briefly with Geronimo Black in 1972.

Captain Beefheart gave him the nickname Feelers Rebo.

Since 2003 he has been touring regularly with the reformed Magic Band.

Recording history

Frank Zappa
Walley played guitar, slide guitar and also provided vocals for the following Frank Zappa albums:
 Bongo Fury
 Joe's Garage Act I
 Joe's Garage Acts II & III
 Tinseltown Rebellion
 Shut Up 'N Play Yer Guitar
 You Are What You Is
 Thing-Fish
 Guitar
 You Can't Do That on Stage Anymore, Vol. 1
 You Can't Do That on Stage Anymore, Vol. 4
 You Can't Do That on Stage Anymore, Vol. 6
 Anyway the Wind Blows
 At The Circus
 Halloween
 Trance-Fusion

Captain Beefheart
On the original Bat Chain Puller album (recorded in 1976, but released only in 2012 due to legal ownership problems) he played accordion on the track "Harry Irene", as well as guitar and slide guitar on all the tracks.

The Magic Band
 Back To The Front
 21st Century Mirror Men
 Performing The Music Of Captain Beefheart - 1: Oxford, U.K. June 6, 2005 
 The Magic Band Plays The Music Of Captain Beefheart - Live In London 2013

Notes

Living people
American male guitarists
Year of birth missing (living people)